Bobovac is a village in central Croatia, in the municipality of Sunja, Sisak-Moslavina County. It is located in the Banija region.

History

Demographics
According to the 2011 census, the village of Bobovac has 330 inhabitants. This represents 44.40% of its pre-war population.
According to the 1991 census, 99.20% of the village population were ethnic Croats (744/out of the 750 residents).

Notable natives and residents

References 

Populated places in Sisak-Moslavina County